The Piaggio P.6 was an Italian catapult-launched reconnaissance floatplane designed and built by Piaggio for the Regia Marina (Italian Royal Navy).

Development
To meet a Regia Marina requirement for a two-seat catapult-launched seaplane, Piaggio produced two designs. The first, designated the P.6bis, was a small biplane flying boat powered by a 190 kW (260 hp) Isotta Fraschini V.6 engine driving a pusher propeller. The second design designated, the P.6, was a floatplane with one large central float and two stabilising floats at the wingtips and a nose-mounted A.20 engine. 

Both aircraft had the same biplane wing structure with rigid strut bracing and both were armed with a single machine gun (the flying-boat's in the bow and the floatplane's in the rear cockpit). In 1928, the P.6ter was produced based on the P.6 floatplane with the engine boosted to 306 kW (410 hp). A production run of 15 P-6ter aircraft was produced for the Italian Navy where it had an unremarkable career, being used on battleships and cruisers.

Variants

P.6bis
Prototype flying boat.
P.6
Prototype floatplane.
P.6ter
Production floatplane, 15 built.

Operators

Regia Marina

Specifications (P.6ter)

See also

References

 

P.006
1920s Italian military reconnaissance aircraft
Floatplanes
Single-engined tractor aircraft
Biplanes
Aircraft first flown in 1927